Tilman Bacon Parks (May 14, 1872 – February 12, 1950) was a U.S. Representative from Arkansas.

Biography
Born near Lewisville, Arkansas, Parks attended the common schools, the University of Texas at Austin, and the University of Virginia at Charlottesville.
He studied law.
He was admitted to the bar in 1900 and commenced practice in Lewisville, Arkansas.
He served as member of the State house of representatives in 1901, 1903, and 1909.
Temporary chairman of the Democratic State convention in 1910.
He served as prosecuting attorney of the eighth judicial circuit of Arkansas 1914–1918.
In 1915 moved to Hope, Arkansas, where he engaged in the practice of law.

Parks was elected as a Democrat to the Sixty-seventh and to the seven succeeding Congresses (March 4, 1921 – January 3, 1937).
He was not a candidate for renomination in 1936.
He continued the practice of law until his retirement.
He died in Washington, D.C., February 12, 1950.
He was interred in the Congressional Cemetery.

References

1872 births
1950 deaths
Burials at the Congressional Cemetery
Democratic Party members of the Arkansas House of Representatives
Democratic Party members of the United States House of Representatives from Arkansas
People from Lewisville, Arkansas